Clavizomus is a monotypic genus of hubbardiid short-tailed whipscorpions, first described by Reddell & Cokendolpher in 1995. Its single species, Clavizomus claviger is distributed in Malaysia and Singapore.

References 

Schizomida genera
Monotypic arachnid genera